"Tokyo Lady" (stylized as TOKYO LADY) is a song by Japanese/Korean musician Iconiq, released as her debut single of August 11, 2010. The single was originally planned for a July 28 release, however was postponed. It is currently her last physical single.

Writing

The song is an electro/rock-styled pop song, written by NaNa Music and Uta, the writers of "Crystal Girl" and "LoveShineMagic" from Iconiq's debut album Change Myself. The lyrics of the song continue on with the same themes as Iconiq's Change Myself songs do, speaking of new beginnings, bright futures and references to objects in everyday life. The scene in "Tokyo Lady" is of a woman after a break up of a relationship, who has already begun the process of moving on. As she walks forward, "the world changes." References are made to the song's protagonist going to a social event, as she "paints the town" while wearing pink high heels, and faces her favorite place while throwing hey car key into her bag.

According to the official site's liner notes, the song is about the "dazzling determination of a woman starting to walk forward to her future," in a metropolitan Tokyo setting. To Iconiq, the song represents the Tokyo aspects to her new start as a musician in Japan, and considers it a message song to encourage women.

Promotion

The song was first unveiled at Iconiq's debut live, at Shibuya-AX on May 16, where it was performed and announced as her first single. The song was marketed as a "three tie-up single," with commercials for three companies airing simultaneously: Shiseido's Maquillage cosmetic range, Morinaga's Weider and Jelly sports drink/A-Nation 2010, and Rechochoku. These began airing on July 21, 2010. The song was performed at A-Nation in early August, 2010, at which Iconiq had a special booth filled with promotional goods for purchase.

This was the fourth successive time an Iconiq song has been used in commercials for both Shisedo and Recochoku, after "I'm Lovin' You," "Change Myself" and "Bye Now!." The commercial for Weider and Jelly/A-Nation, however, showed Iconiq with her previous hairstyle.

The single was promoted as a "one coin single," due to its price of 500 yen. It was also marketed for having three differently designed back covers, that featured a different, wider-angled view of Iconiq from the photoshoot for the single's cover. During single promotions, special billboards were placed at several major Tokyo train stations, on which pairs of fishnet stockings were affixed for the general public to take. 

Iconiq performed this song as a per of her set at the 2010 A-Nation concerts.

Music video

The music video was directed by Diane Martel, and filmed simultaneously in Los Angeles along with the two other music videos for songs on Light Ahead, "Light Ahead" and "Kiss & Cry." The video depicts Iconiq posing in a range of fashion-oriented outfits, against a background of colorful geometric shapes and pop art inspired designs, often with static shots of Iconiq repeated on the screen in multiple places.

Track listing

Chart rankings

Reported sales

Release history

References 

Iconiq songs
2010 singles
Music videos directed by Diane Martel
Japanese-language songs
2010 songs
Rhythm Zone singles